Suzy K. Quinn is a British author, writing chiefly in the romance genre. She is both a published and self-published author, and wrote the Bad Mother's Diary series. The Bad Mother's Diary is a romantic comedy series.

By 2020, Quinn's novels had sold a total of nearly 1 million copies.

Early life and education
Quinn and her sister Cath both entered a competition at school to write a novel. Both sisters were announced as joint winners of the award, both Quinn and her sister have gone on to become authors since that competition. She studied Sociology at the University of Nottingham.

Career
She began her career working as a journalist and ghost writer. She wrote for a number of British newspapers, including The Guardian, Sunday Times Magazine and The Sun. While working as a journalist, she signed her first book deal with Hodder & Stoughton in 2011 and released a psychological thriller. In 2012, Quinn signed a two-book deal with Hachette Livre and released her novel, "Glass Geishas" The novel was later retitled, Night Girls. The book drew on her experiences of working as a geisha in Japan during her twenties. It follows events in the Roppongi district after a hostess goes missing. The novel has also been published in Russia. What's On Dubai listed the book under its top 10 reads for summer 2012.

After having a second daughter, Quinn wrote the Bad Mother's Diary, a romantic comedy about new motherhood and single motherhood. The book also became a bestseller. Quinn's Bad Mother's book series began life as a concept for a magazine article. In an interview, Quinn stated she "just couldn't stop writing" once she started the story of Juliette and Nick (characters from the Bad Mother's Diary). The series has since grown to a collection of six books, which follows the life of a mother through both motherhood and romance. The first of the "Bad Mother's" series outsold all her other books, reaching first position on the romantic comedy list on Amazon.

In 2018, Quinn received a two-book deal from HQ Harper Collins for two psychological thrillers, Don't Tell Teacher and Not My Daughter. Don't Tell Teacher reached number 7 in the UK Kindle charts on its release in March 2018. In May 2020, Quinn released "Not My Daughter," a story about a 16-year-old runaway. Not My Daughter reached number 27 in the UK Kindle charts on its May 2020 release.

In 2020, Quinn released her sixth installment, Bad Mother's Virus. The book was written and released during the UK's COVID-19 pandemic, and tells the story of self-isolating mum during lockdown in Quinn's comical style used throughout the Bad Mother series. All proceeds from the book are donated to the NHS.

Books

Standalone novels
 Night Girls (initially named Glass Geishas) (2012)
 Show, Don't Tell (October 2013)
 I Take This Woman (2013)
 Don't Tell Teacher (March 2019)
 Not My Daughter (May 2020)

Bad mother series
 Bad Mother's Diary (July 2015)
 Bad Mother's Detox (February 2017)
 Bad Mother Begins (March 2017)
 Bad Mother's Pregnancy (2017)
 Bad Mother's Holiday (June 2018)
 Bad Mother's Christmas (October 2019)
 Bad Mother's Virus (May 2020)

Personal life
She currently lives in Wivenhoe, Essex, with her husband and two daughters.

References

External links
 Official website

British writers
Living people
Year of birth missing (living people)
Chick lit writers
British women novelists